Aslauga tanga is a butterfly in the family Lycaenidae. It is found in Tanzania (the Usambara and Nguru mountains).

References

Butterflies described in 1997
Aslauga
Endemic fauna of Tanzania
Butterflies of Africa